Bokermannohyla gouveai is a species of frog in the family Hylidae.
It is endemic to Itatiaia National Park, Brazil.
Its natural habitats are subtropical or tropical moist montane forests, subtropical or tropical high-altitude shrubland, rivers, and pastureland.
It is threatened by habitat loss for logging and agriculture.

References 

Bokermannohyla
Endemic fauna of Brazil
Amphibians described in 1992
Taxonomy articles created by Polbot